Diplomatic relations between Croatia and Hungary were established on 18 January 1992 following Croatia's independence from SFR Yugoslavia.

Croatia has an embassy in Budapest a general consulate in Pécs and a consulate in Nagykanizsa, while Hungary has an embassy in Zagreb, a general consulate in Osijek and honorary consulates in Rijeka, Split and Dubrovnik.

In 1102 the previously independent Kingdom of Croatia and Kingdom of Hungary entered personal union and the two were henceforth ruled by the same monarch. Following the Ottoman conquests and a disastrous defeat at the Battle of Mohács in 1526, Croatian nobility elected the Holy Roman Emperor Ferdinand I as the new king of Croatia. The Hungarian nobility was divided, but the Habsburgs annexed the Kingdom of Hungary, keeping Croatia and Hungary under a single crown. During the Hungarian Revolution of 1848 Croatia sided with the Austrians, so the Croatian Ban Josip Jelačić helped Austria to defeat the Hungarian forces in 1849, ushering in a period of Germanisation. By the 1860s the failure of this policy became apparent, leading to the Austro-Hungarian Compromise of 1867 and the creation of a personal union between the crowns of the Austrian Empire and the Kingdom of Hungary. The issue of Croatia's status was resolved by the Croatian–Hungarian Settlement of 1868, when the kingdoms of Croatia and Slavonia were united into the Kingdom of Croatia-Slavonia. Following the breakup of Austria-Hungary after its defeat in World War I, the Croatian Parliament declared independence on 29 October 1918 and decided to join the newly formed State of Slovenes, Croats and Serbs, ending Habsburg rule and the personal union with Hungary after 816 years. Through the Treaty of Trianon, Hungary lost Međimurje County and the southern part of Baranya to Croatia. Since World War II, relations between two states have been defined by cooperation with Nazis, Soviets and Yugoslavia until the revolutions of 1989 and the breakup of Yugoslavia. Hungary recognised Croatian independence with the rest of the European Economic Community in 1992, and supported Croatia during the Croatian War of Independence.

Croatian and Hungarian high-ranking officials usually meet several times a year. Trade between Croatia and Hungary amounted $1.020 bln in 2012, largely consisting of Hungarian exports to Croatia. Hungarian tourists contribute significantly to Croatian tourism; in 2009, a total of 323,000 visited Croatia, including the Hungarian Prime Minister Viktor Orbán who has spent his summer holidays in Dalmatia for last few decades. Both countries coordinate the development of cross-border infrastructure. Pan-European corridors Vb and Vc connect Budapest to the Adriatic Sea via Zagreb and Osijek. Both countries have sizable minorities living across their common border, and both have passed laws to protect their minority rights.

Croatia and Hungary are parties to 96 bilateral treaties and members of a number of multinational organizations, including NATO and the European Union.

Present

Diplomatic relations

Croatia and Hungary established diplomatic relations on 16 and 18 January 1992, after Hungary recognised the independence of Croatia on 15 January 1992. As of December 2011 Croatia maintains an embassy in Budapest (headed by ambassador Ivan Bandić), a consulate general in Pécs and a consulate in Nagykanizsa. The Nagykanizsa consulate is led by an honorary consul. Hungary maintains an embassy in Zagreb and consulates in Rijeka and Split. The embassy is headed by ambassador Gábor Iván; the offices also include an army and air attaché office in the Republic of Croatia (headed by László Hajas) and the Office for Economic Affairs of the Embassy of the Republic of Hungary in the Republic of Croatia (headed by András Péter Závoczky, Counselor for Economy and Trade).

High level visits
Croatian and Hungarian high-ranking officials (including heads of state, prime ministers and foreign ministers) meet several times a year. In addition, Croatian and Hungarian governments have occasionally held joint sessions since January 2006.

Economy and infrastructure

Trade between Croatia and Hungary amounted to €625,083 in 2009, a decrease from €894,270 in 2008. In 2009 Croatian exports to Hungary reached €132,474, while Hungarian exports to Croatia were worth €492,609. Overall, the 2009 trade volume represented 2.75 percent of total Croatian foreign trade. Croatian–Hungarian trade comprises only a small fraction of total Hungarian foreign trade, reaching 0.54 percent of the total in 2009. Hungarian investments in Croatia rose sharply in 2003, reaching the fourth ranking in that year  following investments exceeding US$630 million, largely in tourism and manufacturing. The largest single investment that year was the purchase of more than 25 percent of the stock of INA for US$500 million by the MOL Group. By 2011, the MOL Group increased its stake in INA to 47.16 percent.

Hungarian tourists contribute significantly to the Croatian tourist industry; in 2009, a total of 323,000 Hungarians visited Croatia as tourists. A total of 1.644 million overnight stays were made by Hungarian tourists in that year alone, ranking Hungarian tourists seventh in the number of nights spent in Croatia (behind the Germans, Slovenes, Italians, Austrians, Czechs and Dutch). At the same time, the Hungarian tourists spent more than 143 million kuna ( €19 million) in Croatia, representing a sharp increase from 69.5 million kuna ( €9.3 million) spent in 2008. In 2009, 103,000 Croatians visited Hungary (excluding family and friend visits) in 356,000 overnight stays, spending 204,000 kuna ( €27,000). This spending represented a 250-percent increase from 2008.

Croatia and Hungary coordinate the development of infrastructure, especially transportation routes. Pan-European corridors Vb and Vc connect Budapest to the Adriatic Sea via Zagreb and Rijeka (Vb) and to Osijek and Ploče (Vc). The Pan-European corridor Vb comprises road and rail links between the Hungarian and Croatian capitals and the Port of Rijeka. The corridor's road component primarily consists of the M7, the A4 and the A6 motorways (as well as several other connecting motorway sections) completed on 22 October 2008. The rail component of the corridor largely uses the route completed in 1873, but it is planned to be rebuilt to increase its capacity. The Pan-European corridor Vc primarily consists of the M6 and the A5 motorways; however, as of December 2011 the motorway is not completed. Other infrastructure jointly developed by Croatia and Hungary includes a €395 million gas pipeline and two electric-power lines. On the  border between Croatia and Hungary there are six international-road border crossings, three rail border crossings and five local-traffic border crossings. Citizens of Croatia and Hungary may cross the border with a valid passport or an identity card for stays of up to 90 days.

Minorities and migrations

According to the 2001 census there are 16,595 Hungarians living in Croatia, representing 0.37 percent of the population. In 2000, there were 15,597 Croats living in Hungary, accounting for 0.15 percent of the total population. The Hungarian minority in Croatia is recognised by the Constitution of Croatia; minority rights (including official use of Hungarian by local governments and education in Hungarian) are safeguarded by legislation enacted by the Sabor. Seven municipalities in Croatia introduced Hungarian for official use (either in part of their territory or the entire municipality), depending on the distribution of the Hungarian population there. There are five Hungarian minority organizations in Croatia, and the Hungarian minority is guaranteed one seat in the Croatian Parliament.

The Hungarian government recognised Croats as a minority native to Hungary; it has decided to implement the optional regulations of the European Charter for Regional or Minority Languages with respect to Croatian and establish a minority self-government for the Croatian minority in Hungary, guaranteeing cultural autonomy. The Croatian minority set up 127 local and 7 county self-governments in Hungary. There are concerns that Croatian minority rights in Hungary are being diminished, but the president of Croatia has assessed that both Croatian and Hungarian minority policies were appropriate. The Croatian minority in Hungary is particularly active in Pécs, where the Scientific Institute of Croats in Hungary and the Croatian Theatre have been established.
The number of migrants between Croatia and Hungary is very low; in 2009, only 22 people emigrated from Hungary to Croatia while a single person emigrated from Croatia to Hungary.

Cultural and scientific cooperation
Croatia and Hungary have agreed to the Cultural Cooperation Programme, which defines cooperation and cultural exchange in the fields of music, theatre and dance, and with respect to the arts, museums, galleries, literature, publishing, libraries, archives, film and cultural-heritage protection. The programme was agreed to on 7 November 2011 in Budapest by secretaries of the Croatian Ministry of Culture and the Hungarian Ministry of National Resources. The programme pertains to the 2012–2014 period and represents a continuation of cultural cooperation through cultural exchange, outside the framework of formal agreements. Cultural, educational and scientific cooperation between the two countries is covered by a treaty of 16 March 1994, with additional treaties regulating diploma recognitions since 16 June 1997 and additional treaties and protocols on scientific and technological cooperation signed in 2002 and 2009. The scientific and educational cooperation entails the awarding of scholarships and bilateral research projects.

Bilateral treaties and multinational organizations

Croatia and Hungary have either signed or succeeded 133 different treaties and other agreements. Some were originally signed by Hungary and SFR Yugoslavia, while Croatia succeeded relevant documents pursuant to decisions of the Badinter Arbitration Committee. 
 As of December 2011 96 remain in force, regulating various aspects of relations between the countries (including minority rights, diplomatic relations, cultural and scientific cooperation, trade and economic relations, Drava river navigation, border control and air transport). Free-trade agreements were signed, but have since been repealed through adoption of similar agreements with the European Union. There were also agreements made with a limited period of application, pertaining to sporting-event security.

Croatia and Hungary are members of several multinational organizations, including the United Nations, the Organization for Security and Co-operation in Europe, the Council of Europe, NATO, the World Trade Organization and the Central European Initiative. In addition, Hungary is a member of the European Union (EU). On 9 December 2011, Croatia signed an EU accession treaty and is expected to become a member on 1 July 2013. Both countries are also taking part in the formulation and implementation of the Danube Strategy, focusing on transport, environmental and economic development of the Danube area and involving most countries along its banks.

History

Personal union

When Stjepan II died in 1091, ending the Trpimirović dynasty rule in the medieval kingdom of Croatia, Ladislaus I of Hungary claimed the Croatian crown. Opposition to the claim led to a war and the personal union of Croatia and Hungary in 1102, ruled by Coloman. For the next four centuries, Croatia was ruled by the Sabor (parliament) and a Ban of Croatia (viceroy) appointed by the king. This period saw an increasing threat of Ottoman conquest and a struggle against the Republic of Venice for control of coastal areas. The Venetians gained control over most of Dalmatia by 1428 except for the city-state of Dubrovnik, which became independent. Ottoman conquests led to the 1493 Battle of Krbava Field and the 1526 Battle of Mohács, both ending in decisive Ottoman victories against Hungarian and Croatian armies. King Louis II died at Mohács; in 1527, the assembly of Croatian nobility meeting at Cetin chose Ferdinand I of Habsburg as the new ruler of Croatia under the conditions that he provide protection to Croatia against the Ottoman Empire and respect its political rights. In political disarray, the divided Hungarian nobility elected two kings simultaneously: János Szapolyai and Ferdinand I. With the conquest of Buda by the Ottomans in 1541, the remaining part of Hungary not ruled by the Ottomans (known as the Royal Hungary) was annexed by the Habsburgs; they ruled as Kings of Hungary, thus keeping the kingdoms of Hungary and Croatia under a single crown.

Habsburg rule

During the 1830s and 1840s romantic nationalism appeared in Croatia, inspiring the Croatian National Revival (a political and cultural campaign advocating the unity of all South Slavs in the empire). Its primary focus was the establishment of a standard language as a counterweight to Hungarian and the promotion of Croatian literature and culture. During the Hungarian Revolution of 1848, Croatia sided with the Austrians; Ban Josip Jelačić helped defeat the Hungarian forces in 1849, ushering in a period of Germanization. By the 1860s the policy's failure became apparent, leading to the Austro-Hungarian Compromise of 1867 and the creation of a personal union between the crowns of the Austrian Empire and the Kingdom of Hungary. The treaty left the issue of Croatia's status to Hungary; this was resolved by the Croatian–Hungarian Settlement of 1868, when the kingdoms of Croatia and Slavonia were united. The Kingdom of Dalmatia remained under de facto Austrian control, while Rijeka retained its status of Corpus separatum introduced in 1779. After Austria-Hungary occupied Bosnia and Herzegovina following the 1878 Treaty of Berlin, the Croatian Military Frontier was abolished and the territory returned to Croatia in 1881. Renewed efforts to reform Austria-Hungary, entailing federalisation with Croatia as a federal unit, were halted by World War I. On 29 October 1918 the Croatian Sabor declared independence and decided to join the newly formed State of Slovenes, Croats and Serbs, ending Habsburg rule and the personal union with Hungary after 816 years.

Treaty of Trianon and World War II

The Treaty of Trianon was signed in 1920, at the end of World War I, between the Allies of World War I and Hungary (as one of the successor states of Austria-Hungary). The treaty regulated the status of the independent Hungarian state and defined its borders. Compared to the prewar Kingdom of Hungary (as a part of Austria-Hungary), post-Trianon Hungary lost 72 percent of its territory. The principal beneficiaries of the territorial division of the prewar Kingdom of Hungary were Romania, Czechoslovakia and the Kingdom of Serbs, Croats and Slovenes. The treaty established the southern border of Hungary along the Drava and Mura rivers (except in Baranya, where only the northern part of the county was retained by Hungary). On 4 December 1918 the State of Slovenes, Croats and Serbs (comprising present-day Croatia) joined the Kingdom of Serbia to form the Kingdom of Serbs, Croats, and Slovenes.

The invasion of Yugoslavia by the Axis Powers began on 6 April 1941, during World War II, and ended with the unconditional surrender of the Royal Yugoslav Army on 17 April 1941. During that time, a genocide of Serbs happened. Many Jews and Roma people were murdered too. Also, during that time, on 12 April the Hungarian Third Army crossed the border (advancing into Međimurje and southern Baranya). Those territorial gains were reversed by Yugoslav partisans and the Red Army in 1944 and 1945, and confirmed by the Paris Peace Treaties of 1947. As World War II was replaced by the Cold War, Hungarian–Croatian relations were substantially dictated by the Soviet Union; it dominated the Eastern Bloc, which included Hungary and Communist-ruled Yugoslavia (which in turn comprised Croatia as its constituent part), as defined by the Tito–Stalin split. This situation ended with the revolutions of 1989, the end of Communism in Hungary and the breakup of Yugoslavia.

Fall of Communism and Croatian independence
Hungary recognised Croatian independence on 15 January 1992 (with the rest of the European Economic Community member states), and established diplomatic relations with Croatia three days later. During the Croatian War of Independence, Croatia obtained arms from several countries (including Hungary), despite a United Nations-imposed arms embargo. As of December 2011, Hungary and Croatia have 96 treaties and agreements in force regulating a wide range of activities and relations (including diplomatic, cultural, economic, energy, transport, education, minority and other issues). Furthermore, Hungary supported the Croatian NATO membership request and Croatian accession to the European Union.

Economy

Hungary → Croatia

Most important Hungarian investors in Croatia: MOL-INA, OTP Bank, TriGránit, AdriaticHolidays

See also 
 Foreign relations of Croatia
 Foreign relations of Hungary
 Hungarians of Croatia
 Croats of Hungary
 Hungary–Yugoslavia relations

References

External links 
  Croatian Minister of Foreign Affairs and European Integration: list of bilateral treaties with Hungary
  Croatian embassy in Budapest (in Croatian and Hungarian only)
  Hungarian embassy in Zagreb

 
Hungary 
Bilateral relations of Hungary